Baron Norton, of Norton-on-the-Moors in the County of Stafford, is a title in the Peerage of the United Kingdom. It was created in 1878 for the Conservative politician and former President of the Board of Trade, Sir Charles Adderley. He was succeeded by his elder son, the second Baron. Two of his sons, the third and fourth Baron, both succeeded in the title. On the latter's death in 1944, the title passed to his eighty-nine-year-old uncle, the fifth Baron.

Barons Norton (1878)
Charles Bowyer Adderley, 1st Baron Norton (1814–1905)
Charles Leigh Adderley, 2nd Baron Norton (1846–1926)
Ralph Bowyer Adderley, 3rd Baron Norton (1872–1933)
Ronald Wollstan Fleetwood Adderley, 4th Baron Norton (1885–1944)
Henry Arden Adderley, 5th Baron Norton (1854–1945)
Hubert Bowyer Arden Adderley, 6th Baron Norton (1886–1961)
John Arden Adderley, 7th Baron Norton (1915–1993)
James Nigel Arden Adderley, 8th Baron Norton (born 1947)

The heir apparent is the present holder's son, the Hon. Edward James Arden Adderley (born 1982).
The heir apparent's heir apparent is his son, Frederick John Arden Adderley (born 2015).

Male-line family tree

Line of succession

  Charles Bowyer Adderley, 1st Baron Norton (1814–1905)
  Charles Leigh Adderley, 2nd Baron Norton (1846–1926)
  Ralph Bowyer Adderley, 3rd Baron Norton (1872–1933)
  Ronald Woolstan Fleetwood Adderley, 4th Baron Norton (1885–1944)
  Henry Arden Adderley, 5th Baron Norton (1854–1945)
  Hubert Bowyer Arden Adderley, 6th Baron Norton (1886–1961)
  John Arden Adderley, 7th Baron Norton (1915–1993)
  James Nigel Arden Adderley, 8th Baron Norton (born 1947)
 (1) Hon. Edward James Arden Adderley (born 1982)
 (2) Frederick John Arden Adderley (born 2015)
 (3) Hon. Nigel John Adderley (born 1950)
 Hon. Michael Charles Adderley (1917–1992)
 (4) Charles Henry Adderley (born 1954)
 (5) Anthony John Adderley (born 1955)
 (6) David Michael Adderley (born 1962)

Notes

References

Baronies in the Peerage of the United Kingdom
Noble titles created in 1878
Noble titles created for UK MPs